Vasudha Patil (Devanagari: वसुधा पाटील) is a Marathi writer from Maharashtra, India.

She started writing in the 1970s Marathi short stories and one-act plays, some of which pertain to the contemporary change in the role of women in Marathi-speaking (and Indian) society, economic and intellectual freedom of women, and assertion of women's rights.

The following are some of Patil's works:

 Deepagriha Ani Samudrapakshi (दीपगृह आणि समुद्रपक्षी)  (एकांकिका)
 Phakta Ek Warsha Teen Mahine (फक्त एक वर्ष तीन महिने)
 Gulam Ani Itar Katha (गुलाम आणि इतर कथा)
 Jamunake Tir (जमुनाके तीर) (1968)
 Pakshiteerth (पक्षीतीर्थ) (एकांकिका)
 Utarati Unhe (उतरती उन्हं)
 Namarda (नामर्द)
 Pankha (पंख)
 Sanai (सनई)

See also
 List of Indian writers

References

Marathi-language writers
Year of birth missing (living people)
Living people